The United Kingdom driving test is a test of competence that UK residents take in order to obtain a full Great Britain or Northern Ireland (car) driving licence or to add additional full entitlements to an existing one. Tests vary depending on the class of vehicle to be driven. In Great Britain it is administered by the Driver and Vehicle Standards Agency (DVSA) and in Northern Ireland by the Driver & Vehicle Agency (DVA).

The minimum age at which one can take a UK driving test is currently 16 for mopeds and 17 for cars (16 for those on the higher/enhanced rate of the mobility component of DLA or PIP). There is no upper age limit. In addition to a driving licence, a Compulsory Basic Training (CBT) certificate may be required before a moped or motorcycle is ridden.

Around 1.6 million people sit the practical car test each year, with a pass rate of around 43%. The theory test has a pass rate of around 50%. To become a category B (car) licence holder, candidates pay £23 for the theory test and £62 (£45.50 in Northern Ireland) for the practical driving test.

History 
UK driving licences were introduced by the Motor Car Act 1903 but no test was required. The intention was purely to identify vehicles and their drivers. The Road Traffic Act 1930 introduced age restrictions and a test for disabled drivers; this was the first formal driving test in the UK. These licences were only valid for one year from the date of issue. Legislation for compulsory testing was introduced for all new drivers with the Road Traffic Act 1934. The test was initially voluntary to avoid a rush of candidates until 1 June 1935 when all people who had started to drive on or after 1 April 1934 needed to have passed the test.

Testing was suspended during World War II,
and was suspended again during the Suez Crisis in 1956 to allow examiners to help to administer petrol rations. During the Coronavirus pandemic, testing was also suspended; in England between March and July 2020 and January and April 2021; in Wales, between March and August 2020 and January and April 2021; in Scotland, between March 2020 and May 2021; and in Northern Ireland between March 2020 and April 2021. Key workers were still allowed to take tests if they had submitted the correct paperwork.

The driving theory test was introduced in July 1996 as a written examination, which was updated to computerised format in 
2000. The hazard perception segment of the theory test was introduced in November 2002. In January 2015, new CGI clips replaced the real-life video clips in the Hazard Perception Test.

The current test
Drivers wishing to gain a category B (car) licence need to pass two separate tests. First, the theory test must be passed. The candidate then has two years to pass their practical test before their theory test certificate expires and they have to take the theory again. Upon passing the practical test, drivers are given a pass certificate (acting as a temporary licence) and immediately become category B licence holders.

Theory test 
The theory test is made up of two parts, both of which differ according to the type of vehicle licence the candidate is pursuing:

 Multiple-choice test 
 Hazard perception test

Both parts must be passed in order to obtain a theory test pass certificate. This enables the candidate to book a practical driving test. Candidates have two years from the date that they passed the first part of their theory test to take their practical test, or they will have to pass both parts of the theory test once again before they can book a practical test.

Multiple-choice test 
This part of the theory test is performed on a computer system. The test has 50 multiple choice questions and the candidate must answer at least 43 (86%) of them correctly to pass. All questions are randomly selected from a bank of just under one thousand on a selection of topics.

The test lasts for 57 minutes although candidates with certain special needs can apply for more time. All 50 questions must be answered. The test allows 15 minutes practice time at the start of the exam to get used to answering the questions and how to use the system. To answer a question the candidate simply touches their choice of answer from the listed answers on the computer screen. If a mistake is made the candidate can deselect a choice and reselect a different option. The candidate is allowed to go back to a question at any time and can also flag questions they are unsure of in order to find and return to it quickly and easily later.

For lorry and bus drivers, 100 questions are asked over a 115-minute period, and 85 out of 100 must be answered correctly to pass.

Prior to 3 September 2007, the car and motorcycle multiple-choice tests comprised 35 questions, with a pass mark of 30 within a 40-minute time limit.

Hazard perception 

Candidates watch fourteen one-minute clips (nineteen clips for lorry and bus candidates) filmed from the perspective of a car driver or motorcyclist and have to indicate, usually by clicking a mouse button or touching the screen, when they observe a developing hazard.

Practical test 
Unless one is converting a foreign licence, it is necessary to have passed both components of the theory test before sitting this exam. Passing the practical test entitles one to hold a full UK driving licence.

The test candidate must produce their provisional licence for the examiner before the test starts.

The practical car test can be taken in either a manual or an automatic car; if the test is passed in an automatic car, then the full licence granted will be restricted to automatic cars only.

The practical motorcycle test is split into two separate modules: the off-road module and the on-road module. To get a full motorcycle licence, the candidate needs to pass both modules.

Format 
The practical car test is taken on the road, with a professionally trained DVSA examiner directing the candidate around a pre-determined route. The examiner marks the candidate for driving faults, serious faults, and dangerous faults. A candidate will fail the test if he or she accumulates any serious or dangerous faults, or more than fifteen driving faults. If a candidate accumulates several driving faults in the same category, the examiner may consider the fault habitual and mark a serious fault in that category. Committing a dangerous fault may result in the immediate termination of the test, especially if committed early on, though this is left to the judgement of the examiner. The test usually lasts 38 to 40 minutes in a standard test, or approximately 70 minutes when the candidate is taking an extended test after having had their licence revoked. In October 2019 the traditional paper marking sheet was replaced by an iPad. Instead of being handed a paper copy of the examiner's report, candidates received a summary of their performance via email.

Eyesight test 
Before getting to the car, the examiner will ask the candidate to read a car's number plate at a distance. If the candidate needs corrective lenses to do this, then they must be worn during the test. If the candidate fails to read the first number plate correctly, then the examiner asks the candidate to read a second number plate. If the candidate cannot correctly read the second number plate, they will be taken further forward for one more attempt. If the number plate cannot read from here, then the examiner must use a tape measure to measure the correct distance between the candidate and a third number plate. If the candidate cannot read the third number plate, then the candidate is deemed to have failed and the test will not continue. The DVLA will be informed and the candidate's provisional licence will be revoked.

The candidate will have to reapply for a provisional driving licence and attend a test centre to have an eyesight check before they are allowed to rebook a test. If successful, the DVSA standard eyesight test must still be completed at the candidate's next practical driving test.

Vehicle safety questions 
The "Show me tell me" changed on 4 December 2017. The examiner will ask the candidate one ‘tell me’ question (where you explain how they would carry out a safety task) at the start of the test and before the candidate starts driving. This new element is to allow the candidate to demonstrate how to carry out a safety task while driving. These are phrased in the form "Show me..." and "Tell me..."; as such. The "show me" questions that may be asked while the vehicle is moving are:
 "When it’s safe to do so, can you show me how you wash and clean the rear windscreen?"
 "When it’s safe to do so, can you show me how you wash and clean the front windscreen?"
 "When it’s safe to do so, can you show me how you’d switch on your dipped headlights?"
 "When it’s safe to do so, can you show me how you’d set the rear demister?"
 "When it’s safe to do so, can you show me how you’d operate the horn?"
 "When it’s safe to do so, can you show me how you’d demist the front windscreen?"
 "When it’s safe to do so, can you show me how you’d open and close the side window?"
The "tell me" questions only require the candidate to explain how an action would be performed. They do not have to perform the action in question but will not be marked down if they have to physically demonstrate it in order to adequately explain their knowledge. There are two types of "tell me" question but the candidate will only be asked one "tell me" question in total; either one from category one or one from category two. The first type of question is asked while the candidate is seated inside the vehicle and there are 11 questions of this nature. The second type begins with "Open the bonnet and...". These questions require the candidate to exit the vehicle and open the engine compartment of the vehicle (the candidate should know how to operate the bonnet release on the vehicle they are driving). There are only three "open the bonnet" questions.

Some examples of "tell me" questions are:-
 "Tell me how you’d check that the brakes are working before starting a journey."
 "Tell me where you’d find the information for the recommended tyre pressures for this car and how tyre pressures should be checked."
 "Tell me how you make sure your head restraint is correctly adjusted so it provides the best protection in the event of a crash."
 "Tell me how you’d check the tyres to ensure that they have sufficient tread depth and that their general condition is safe to use on the road."
 "Tell me how you’d check that the headlights and tail lights are working. You don’t need to exit the vehicle."
The questions of the second type of "tell me" questions (i.e. "open the bonnet") are:
 "Open the bonnet and tell me how you’d check that the engine has sufficient oil."
 "Open the bonnet and tell me how you’d check that the engine has sufficient engine coolant."
 "Open the bonnet and tell me how you’d check that you have a safe level of hydraulic brake fluid."
If the candidate answers one or both of the "show me" and "tell me" questions incorrectly, one driving fault is recorded. As the candidate is permitted a maximum of fifteen driving faults during the practical test, this means that they would not automatically fail the test based on their answers to these questions alone unless the examiner believed that the fault was serious.

Controlled stop 
The controlled stop, more commonly referred to as the "emergency stop", is an exercise which determines the ability of the candidate to stop the vehicle promptly yet under control during a simulated emergency. The simulation is performed by the examiner raising his or her hand and saying, "STOP!". A controlled stop exercise will be carried out on every extended test and one third of normal tests. This might be an emergency stop, or the candidate might be asked to make a controlled stop in a specific location.

Manoeuvres 
In Great Britain, the driving test changed on 4 December 2017. The manoeuvres that a candidate would be asked to perform no longer include a turn in the road or a reverse to the left. Candidates may be asked to:
 Reverse park into a parking space either parallel to the kerb (on road), or oblique or right-angle (in a marked bay in an off-road car park)  
 Park on the right hand side of the road, reverse two car lengths and re-join the traffic. (From December 2017)  
 Drive forward into a bay and reverse out

General driving 
Generally, the candidate must demonstrate an ability to drive in various road and traffic conditions  and react appropriately in actual risk situations. The conditions typically encountered on test include driving in urban areas as well as higher speed limit roads where possible; this includes dual carriageways but not motorways. Motorways in Great Britain can only be used by full licence holders, and learner drivers in a dual control vehicle with a licensed instructor in the passenger seat. 

The object of the test is to ensure that the candidate is well grounded in the basic principles of safe driving, and is sufficiently practiced in them to be able to show, at the time of the test, that they are a competent and considerate driver and are not a source of danger to themselves or to other road users. The drive will include two or three normal stops at (and moving away from) the side of the road on level roads as well as on gradients, in addition to a demonstration of moving away from behind a stationary vehicle. 

The regulations state that the on-road driving time must be no less than 30 minutes.
If at any point during the test, the examiner has to intervene with any controls, this will usually but not always result in failure and could be marked on the test report as a serious or dangerous fault.

Independent driving 
In Great Britain, this part of the test was changed in December 2017. The independent portion of the practical test is now longer; having been increased from around 10 minutes to approximately 20 minutes. The candidate may be asked to follow a Satellite Navigation (SatNav) device rather than follow signs. SatNav's are not used in tests carried out in Northern Ireland.

This section is included on practical driving tests for the following vehicles or licences: 
 Car
 Motorcycle module two 
 Large goods vehicle (LGV)
 Passenger carrying vehicle (PCV) tests
 Approved driving instructor (ADI) driving ability (sometimes called 'part two')
 Taxi

During the independent driving section, candidates have to follow:

traffic signs to a destination, or
instructions from a SatNav (GB only), or
 a series of verbal instructions, or
 a combination of the above.

Candidates are permitted to deviate from the given route if they get lost and they will not receive any faults for this providing they are driving safely.  For example, if a candidate is instructed by the SatNav to proceed straight ahead at a junction but they find themselves in a 'left turn only' lane. The correct course of action would be to make a lane change if it is safe to do so without causing risk or inconvenience to others; otherwise stay in the lane and turn left using normal and safe procedure (eg. mirrors, signal, manoeuvre). Once through the junction safely, the candidate can attempt to return to their route. A  fault may be given if the candidate was to proceed straight ahead in the left turn lane as this can be dangerous to other road users. When a candidate deviates from the route the examiner may direct them back towards their destination until the candidate is able to resume independent driving. If a SatNav is being used this may automatically recalculate a new route to get them back on course.

If there is poor or obscured traffic signs, the examiner may give the candidate directions until they can see the next traffic sign. Candidates do not need to have a detailed knowledge of the area. If the SatNav gives incorrect directions the examiner will assist the candidate with verbal direction. The SatNav device (if used) is brought by the examiner and they will set it up for the candidate. The DVSA currently issues the TomTom Start 52 to its driving examiners. Some driving instructors will use this exact model during lessons in order to familiarise students with the layout of the device.

If the candidate has special needs, the examiner will be able to make reasonable adjustments. For the independent driving section, this could be asking the candidate which method they prefer - following signs, or a series of directions (a maximum of three)

Northern Ireland 
In Northern Ireland, the DVA is responsible for the practical driving test and it is slightly different from that carried out in Great Britain by the DVSA.

There are similarities between the GB and NI test. These are carried out in the same way as detailed above. These Include:

 The Eyesight Test
 Show Me, Tell Me Questions
 Driving Faults (including examiner intervention)
 Test Length (40 minutes)

The independent driving portion of the test will last approximately 30 minutes and, unlike GB, will never make use of a SatNav. All candidates will be required to follow road signs and/or verbal directions given by the examiner. As in GB, if candidates forget directions or make an incorrect turn, they may ask for the instruction to be repeated and, as long as they have driven safely, they will not receive any faults.

The manoeuvre's in Northern Ireland are different and may be one of the following:

 Turn in the road
 Reverse to the left (round a corner)
 Reverse bay park
 Parallel park

All candidates will be required to carry out the emergency stop procedure.

In Northern Ireland, candidates may drive on roads with higher speed limits, but due to speed restrictions imposed on learner drivers, they must not exceed 45mph (72km/h) as this will be recorded as a fault for 'use of speed' (speeding).

When a candidate is successful and has passed the driving test, they must display 'R' plates (Restricted) on the vehicle (similar to L plates) for 1 year after the date they passed. "R driver's" are also restricted to 45mph (72km/h). Although limited to 45mph, they are permitted to drive on motorways.

Covid-19 changes to the practical driving test (2020-2021) 
In 2020, as a result of the Covid-19 pandemic, practical driving tests were temporarily delayed and a number of changes were bought into force which included:  

 Candidates who had a test booked in at the start of the pandemic were given a new date. If the two years between the theory test and practical test had elapsed then the pupil was required to resit the theory and hazard perception test.
 When arriving at the test centre, wearing a face covering was a requirement unless you were medically exempt. However, wearing glasses did not count as a good reason so pupils who wore glasses were advised to practice during their lessons.
 If during the test, a pupil committed a serious or dangerous fault, which meant they failed the test, then the examiner would guide the student back to the test centre and the test would end in order to minimise the contact together in the vehicle.
 Driving instructors were not allowed to accompany candidates on their driving tests.
 At the end of the test, the examiner gave feedback from outside of the vehicle and at this point the candidate may ask the instructor to come over to listen if it is safe to do so.

This guidance was formally withdrawn on 19 July 2021.

See also
Driving test
Compulsory Basic Training
Pass Plus
Motorbike practical test
Eco Driving
UK Road Signs

References

External links
Practical driving test : Directgov - Motoring (England, Scotland, Wales)
DVA practical test website (Northern Ireland)
DVA Driving Test Info 

Road transport in the United Kingdom
Test